Bruno Flecker (born 14 August 1953) is an Austrian rower. He competed in the men's quadruple sculls event at the 1980 Summer Olympics.

References

External links
 

1953 births
Living people
Austrian male rowers
Olympic rowers of Austria
Rowers at the 1980 Summer Olympics
Rowers from Linz